Nizhnyaya Kama National Park (in both languages: "Lower Kama National Park") is a national park in the center of Russia, located in Tukayevsky and Yelabuzhsky Districts of Tatarstan. It was established April 20, 1991 to protect coniferous (mostly pine) forests at the banks of the Kama River.

Location and geography
The park consists of three isolated clusters. Two of them - Maly Bor and Tanayavskaya Dacha - are located close to the city of Yelabuga, on the right bank of the Kama, whereas the third one, Bolshoy Bor, is situated on the peninsula on the left bank of the Kama, outside the city of Naberezhnye Chelny. In the limits of the park, the Kama is built as Nizhnekamsk Reservoir. The right bank of the river is high, with ravines. The Toyma River is the biggest tributary of the Kama inside the part. The left bank of the Kama is flat. Below the dam, the Kama meanders, and the meadows on the right bank in this area also belong to the park.

Fauna
Big mammals widespread in the park include moose, roe deer, boar, lynx, badger, eurasian beaver, and raccoon dog. There are several species of bats, some of which are rare. The park has over 190 species of birds, 6 species of reptiles, 10 species of amphibia, and 16 species of fish.

Flora
The areas adjacent to Nizhnekamsk Reservoir are covered by forest. Forest is also present far from the shore, as isolated clusters. Among the trees, the most common are pine (65.4% of the forest area), birch (19%), and aspen (6%). Some of the forest was planted.

References

External links 

 Official Maps of the Park (in Russian)

Geography of Tatarstan
National parks of Russia
Protected areas established in 1991
Tourist attractions in Tatarstan
1991 establishments in Russia